The Semporna District is an administrative district in the Malaysian state of Sabah, part of the Tawau Division which includes the districts of Kunak, Lahad Datu, Semporna and Tawau. The capital of the district is in Semporna Town.

Demographics 

According to the last census in 2010, the population of Semporna district is estimated to be around 133,164 inhabitants. As in other districts of Sabah, there are a significant number of illegal immigrants from the nearby southern Philippines, mainly from the Sulu Archipelago and Mindanao.

Climate

Gallery

See also 
 Districts of Malaysia

References

Further reading

External links 

  Semporna District Council
  Semporna District Office